Sergey Vladimirovich Antufyev (born 22 September 1955) is a Russian politician. He served as a governor of Smolensk Oblast in 2007–2012.

References

1955 births
Living people
People from Kostanay Region
United Russia politicians
21st-century Russian politicians
Governors of Smolensk Oblast
Fourth convocation members of the State Duma (Russian Federation)
Fifth convocation members of the State Duma (Russian Federation)
Members of the Federation Council of Russia (1996–2000)
Members of the Federation Council of Russia (after 2000)